Hartpury University RFC is an English rugby union club. The men's first team play in the second tier of the English rugby union league system, the RFU Championship, having won promotion from National League 1 at the end of the 2016–17 season.

The club is based at Hartpury University in Gloucestershire, England, and is made up primarily of the college's students and staff. Hartpury University share a close relationship with Premiership Rugby side Gloucester, who use Hartpury's facilities as their permanent training base and provide a small number of academy players, all of whom are current or recently departed students, to supplement the Hartpury University team. Several Hartpury University players have gone on to play for Gloucester and other professional teams. They also jointly run the Gloucester-Hartpury Women team in Women's Super Rugby.

History
Hartpury College Rugby Academy was formed in September 2000 in partnership with Gloucester Rugby, consisting of a University side that competed in the BUCS league system and under-18 teams. In 2004, The college's vision of a Saturday side came to fruition, and became known as Hartpury College RFC. 

Starting in the eleventh tier of the league pyramid, Hartpury lost their first ever match in the  Gloucester Three North league. That was to be the last time that the club lost a league match until 2009, when they lost to Thornbury after four consecutive promotions, an EDF Junior Vase and an EDF Senior Vase. That setback did not prevent Hartpury from gaining further promotions to National League 1. During this time the team both the level six Champions Cup and EDF Intermediate Cup at Twickenham. In the 2016–17 season, their third at Level 3, Hartpury created history in winning National League 1 with a 100% record — winning all thirty of their fixtures and only twice failing to secure a four-try bonus point.

As a result, the club now play in the Greene King IPA Championship. The first season saw them finish in 10th place, but comfortably clear of relegation. The finish continued Hartpury's remarkable record of having improved their final league position in every single year of their existence.

Honours
 RFU Gloucester Three North champions: 2004–05
 RFU Gloucester Two champions: 2005–06
 RFU Gloucester One champions: 2006–07
 EDF Junior Vase winners: 2006–07
 RFU Gloucester Premier champions: 2007–08
 EDF Senior Vase winners: 2007–08
 Tribute Western Counties North champions: 2008–09
 EDF Intermediate Cup winners: 2008–09
 Tribute South West Division 1 West champions: 2009–10
 RFU Level Six Champions Cup winners: 2009–10
 National Division Three South West champions: 2010–11
 National Division Two South champions: 2013–14
 National League 1 champions: 2016–17

Current standings

Current squad

The Hartpury University squad for the 2022–23 season is:

Notable former players

Gallagher Premiership
 Mat Gilbert (Bath Rugby)
 Dave Lewis (Harlequins)
 Jonny May (Gloucester Rugby)
 Alex Cuthbert (Exeter Chiefs)
 Tom Savage (Gloucester Rugby)
 Jake Polledri (Gloucester Rugby)
 Charlie Sharples (Gloucester Rugby)
 Elliott Stooke (Bath Rugby)
 Dan Robson (Wasps RFC)
 Gareth Evans (Gloucester Rugby)
 Henry Trinder (Gloucester Rugby)
 Callum Braley (Gloucester Rugby)
 Richard Barrington (Saracens)
 Ed Shervington (Worcester Warriors)
 Ryan Mills (Worcester Warriors)
 Ben Vellacott (Gloucester Rugby)
 Ellis Genge (Bristol Bears)
 Callum Braley (Gloucester Rugby)

Guinness Pro12
 Andries Pretorius (Cardiff Blues)
 Callum Black (Ulster Rugby)
 Dan Tuohy (Ulster Rugby)

RFU Championship
 Tristan Roberts (Bristol Rugby)
 Matt Evans (Cornish Pirates)
 Alex Dancer (Cornish Pirates)
 Dean Brooker (Cornish Pirates)
 Jordi Pasqualin (London Scottish)
 Greg King (Moseley)
 Tom Calladine (Nottingham)
 Tom Harrison (Plymouth Albion)
 Paul Jarvis (Doncaster Knights)

James Merriman ( Bristol)

References

External links
 Hartpury University
 Championship Rugby

English rugby union teams
Forest of Dean
Hartpury College
Rugby clubs established in 2004
Rugby union in Gloucestershire
University and college rugby union clubs in England